This is a two-part chronological list of the works of anthropologist Marvin Harris. The first list contains his scholarly articles; the second contains his books.


Articles and book chapters

 Full version
1959

1962 - "Race Relations Research and Research Auspices in the United States." Information 1:28-51.
1963 - "The Structural Significance of Brazilian Racial Categories" (with Conrad Kottak) Sociologia 25: 203-208 (São Paulo)
1964 - "Racial Identity in Brazil." Luso-Brazilian Review 1:21-28.
1965 - "The Myth of the Sacred Cow." In Man, Culture and Animals, 217-28. Washington D.C.: American Association for the Advancement of Science.
1966
 Full pdf 
 "Race, Conflict, and Reform in Mocambique." In The Transformation of East Africa, 157 - 83.
1967
 "The Classification of Stratified Groups." In Social Structure, Stratification, and Mobility, 298 - 324. Washington, D.C.: Pan-American Union.
 "The Myth of the Sacred Cow." Natural History (March):6-12.
1968
 "Big Bust on Morningside Heights." The Nation June 10, 1968 757-763. *Big Bust on Morningside Heights
 "Race." in International Encyclopedia of the Social Sciences, 13:263-69.
 "Report on N.S.F. Grant G.S. 1128, Techniques of Behavioral Analysis." Unpublished manuscript
1969 - "Patterns of Authority and Superordination in Lower Class Urban Domiciles." Research proposal submitted to the National Science Foundation. Unpublished manuscript.
1970 - "Referential Ambiguity in the Calculus of Brazilian Racial Identity." Southwestern Journal of Anthropology 26:1-14.
1971 - "Comments on Alan Heston's 'An Approach to the Sacred Cow of India." Current Anthropology 12: 199-201
1972 - "Portugal's Contribution to the Underdevelopment of Africa and Brazil." In Ronald Chilcote, ed., Protest and Resistance in Angola and Brazil Berkeley: University of California Press, pp. 209–223
1974 - "Reply to Corry Azzi." Current Anthropology 15: 323.
1975 - "Why a Perfect Knowledge of All the Rules That One Must Know in Order to Act Like a Native Cannot Lead to a Knowledge of How Natives Act." Journal of Anthropological Research 30: 242-251
1976 - "Levi-Strauss et La Palourde." L'Homme 16: 5 - 22.
1976 - "History and Significance of the Emic/Etic Distinction." Annual Review of Anthropology 5:329-50.
1977 - "Why Men Dominate Women" New York Times Magazine, date:(      )
1977 - "Bovine Sex and Species Ratios in India." Paper read at American Anthropological Association meetings in Houston
1978
Also published in 
"Origins of the U.S. Preference for Beef." Psychology Today, October: 88-94.
1979
 "The Human Strategy: Our Pound of Flesh." Natural History 88:30-41.
 "Reply to Sahlins." New York Review of Books. 
 1980 - "History and Ideological Significance of the Separation of Social and Cultural Anthropology." In Beyond the Myths of Culture: Essays in Cultural Materialism, edited by Eric Ross, 391-407. New York: Academic Press
1982 - "Mother Cow" Anthropology 81/82, Annual Editions
1984

 "A Cultural Materialist Theory of Band and Village Warfare: The Yanomamo Test." In Warfare, Culture, and Environment, edited by R. Brian Ferguson, 111-40. Orlando: Academic Press
1987 - "Cultural Materialism: Alarums and Excursions." In Waymarks: The Notre Dame Inaugural lectures in Anthropology
1990 - "Emics and Etics Revisited; Harris's Reply to Pike; Harris's Final Response." In Emics and Etics: The Insider/Outsider Debate, edited by Thomas N. Headland, Kenneth L. Pike, and Marvin Harris, 48-61, 75-83, 202-16. Newbury Park: Sage.
1991 - "Anthropology: Ships that Crash in the Night." In Perspectives on Social Science: The Colorado Lectures, edited by Richard Jessor, 70-114. Boulder, CO: Westview.
1992 - "Distinguished Lecture: Anthropology and the Theoretical and Paradigmatic Significance of the Collapse of the Soviet and European Communism." American Anthropologist 94:295-305.
1993
 "Who are the Whites?" Social Forces 72: 451-62.
 "The Evolution of Gender Hierarchies: a Trial Formulation." in Sex and Gender Hierarchies, edited by Barbara Diane Miller

 1995
 "Commentary on articles by Nancy Scheper-Hughes and Roy D'Andrade. Current Anthropology 36: 423-24.
 "Anthropology and Postmodernism" in Science, Materialism, and the Study of Culture (which is dedicated to Harris) edited by Martin F. Murphy and Maxine L. Margolis.

Books
1964 Patterns of Race in the Americas  (adapted from material delivered on the Columbia Lectures in International Studies television series)
1964 The Nature of Cultural Things. Studies in Anthropology Series AS5. Random House Paperback. Library of Congress Catalogue Card Number: 63-19713 
1969 Town and Country in Brazil 
1971 Culture, Man, and Nature: An Introduction to General Anthropology (1st Edition)
1974 Cows, Pigs, Wars, and Witches: The Riddles of Culture 
1977 Cannibals and Kings: Origins of Cultures 
1981 America Now: Why Nothing Works (Re-printed in 1987 as Why Nothing Works: The Anthropology of Daily Life) 
1985 Good to Eat: Riddles of Food and Culture (Re-printed in 1987 as The Sacred Cow and the Abominable Pig: Riddles of Food and Culture; re-printed in 1998 as Good to Eat: Riddles of Food and Culture) 
1987 Death, Sex, and Fertility: Population Regulation in Preindustrial and Developing Societies 
1987 Food and Evolution: Toward a Theory of Human Food Habits (editor) 
1990 Emics and Etics : The Insider/Outsider Debate (editor) 
1990 Our Kind: Who We Are, Where We Came From, Where We Are Going 
1997 Culture, People, Nature: An Introduction to General Anthropology (7th Edition) 
1999  Paperback 
1968 and 2001  Paperback 
1979 and 2001  Paperback 
2007 Cultural Anthropology (7th Edition)

References

External links
Marvin Harris' major works. Overviews and chapter headings.

Bibliographies by writer
Anthropology literature
Bibliographies of American writers
Science bibliographies